Stiphrometasia monialis is a moth in the family Crambidae. It is found in India, Iran, Iraq, Turkmenistan, Uzbekistan and the United Arab Emirates.

References

Cybalomiinae
Moths described in 1872